The Jewish Observer was an American Orthodox Jewish magazine published by the Agudath Israel of America, from 1963 until 2009. It was put on "hiatus" in 2009, with plans to restart once the finances of the magazine, affected by the economic crisis, were figured out. As of 2019, it has not published any new issues since its 2009 hiatus.

The magazine generally presented a haredi viewpoint. Published since 1963, it was printed nine months a year; the January and February issues were combined, and there were no issues in July or August. The magazine's website contains downloadable PDF copies of most issues while the website of the Lefkowitz Leadership Institute contains PDF files of every single issue since 1963.

It was founded by Ernst L. Bodenheimer and Moshe Sherer, and the Editor for the first seven seasons was Nachman Bulman and from then until it ended publication was Nisson Wolpin. 

Contributors to the Jewish Observer included Avi Shafran, Zalman I. Posner, Mendel Weinbach, Nosson Scherman,  Aaron Twerski, Jonathan Rosenblum, Bernard Fryshman, Yitzchok Adlerstein, Yakov Horowitz and Yitzchok Lowenbraun.  The magazine ceased operations in 2010.

References

External links

 Agudah Official Complete digitized archives from 1963 onwards
 Archive.org PDF Archive 1973 to 2005

 Shema Yisroel website PDF thumbnails 2002-2006

Defunct magazines published in the United States
Jewish magazines published in the United States
Magazines established in 1963
Magazines disestablished in 2010